Bizerba SE & Co. KG is a German provider of weighing and slicing technologies for industry and trade and is a worldwide leading specialist in industrial weighing and labeling technologies.

It was founded in 1866 Andreas Bizer in Balingen. Its name is a composite of Bizer and the city's name. Bizerba currently has over 100 divisions worldwide and a headquarters located in Balingen, Germany.

Bizerba has approximately 4100 employees worldwide, including its headquarters and 3 production facilities in Germany as well as 41 subsidiaries and 69 national representatives.

Bizerba USA, Inc. has been incorporated in 1984 as a subsidiary of parent company Bizerba SE & Co. KG (Germany). Its corporate office is located in Joppa, MD, USA. Bizerba is working with factory authorized distributors in all 50 USA states and Puerto Rico. Bizerba Engineered Solutions is a new subsidiary located in Richmond USA.

Milestones

Bizerba is well known in the food industry for pioneering some very important developments and achievements:

1866: Bizerba founded in Balingen, Germany by Andreas Bizer
1924: The world's first pendulum scale was patented by Bizerba
1930: First industrial scale worldwide was designed and produced by Bizerba. The numerical printing system and dial controls were technological marvels of their time.
1965: Bizerba brings electronics into retail shops. Now weight reporting against different product pricing structures was easier than ever.
2002: Bizerba introduces the first CE class touch screen scales that revolutionize scale management and updating.
2006: Bizerba introduces Optical Article Recognition Scale CE-H 800 SV
2007: First generation of modular checkweigher leave the factory
2010: The new Ceraclean surface finish is introduced to Bizerba slicers
2011: With the appointment of Andreas Wilhelm Kraut as Chairmen of the Executive Board (CEO) the family company Bizerba is again managed by a fifth generation shareholder
2012: Bizerba develops the KScalePad, which is a weighing counter board that serves as a weighing platform and work surface for hygienic cutting
Dec-2015: Bizerba continues to expand its international network of sites. In November, the market-leading provider of solutions for weighing, slicing and labelling technology opened a branch in Singapore.
Jan-2016: Bizerba bought back the company shares from the Zurich Deutscher Herold Lebensversicherung AG. After around 20 years, the company is now once again under the full ownership of the founding family Kraut.
Feb-2016: Bizerba takes over the Italian company Mac & Label. With its head office in Cesena, the company is specialized in labeling applicators for the fruit and vegetable sector.
Apr-2016: Bizerba recorded sales of 598.6 million euros and 19 percent growth in its fiscal year 2015 as a result of sales increases in all regions worldwide
Apr-2018: Bizerba recorded sales of 677 million euros and 14 percent growth
May-2021: Bizerba recorded sales of 729 million euros and 4 percent growth

References

External links

 Bizerba

Companies based in Baden-Württemberg
German brands
Manufacturing companies of Germany
Weighing scale manufacturers
Zollernalbkreis